John 1:27 is the twenty-seventh verse in the first chapter of the Gospel of John in the New Testament of the Christian Bible.

Content
In the original Greek according to Westcott-Hort this verse is:
Αὐτός ἐστιν ὁ ὀπίσω μου ἐρχόμενος, ὃς ἔμπροσθέν μου γέγονεν· οὗ ἐγὼ οὐκ εἰμὶ ἄξιος ἵνα λύσω αὐτοῦ τὸν ἱμάντα τοῦ ὑποδήματος.  

In the King James Version of the Bible the text reads:
He it is, who coming after me is preferred before me, whose shoe’s latchet I am not worthy to unloose.

The New International Version translates the passage as:
He is the one who comes after me, the thongs of whose sandals I am not worthy to untie."

Analysis
"He it is who, coming after me, ..." is said to refer to Christ who will baptize, with a baptism that perfects John's. As St. Cyril of Alexandria paraphrases, “I in preparation wash with water those who are polluted with sins as a beginning of repentance, and by this means leading you from what is lower I prepare you for more lofty things. For He who is the giver of greater things, and of the highest perfection, is about to come after me.”

Commentary from the Church Fathers
Gregory the Great: "Made before me, i. e. preferred before me. He comes after me, that is, He is born after me; He is made before me, that is, He is preferred to me."

Chrysostom: "But lest thou shouldest think this to be the result of comparison, he immediately shows it to be a superiority beyond all comparison; Whose shoe’s latchet I am not worthy to unloose: as if He said, He is so much before me, that I am unworthy to be numbered among the lowest of His attendants: the unloosing of the sandal being the very lowest kind of service."

Augustine: "To have pronounced himself worthy even of unloosing His shoe’s latchet, he would have been thinking too much of himself."

Gregory the Great: "Or thus: It was a law of the old dispensation, that, if a man refused to take the woman, who of right came to him, to wife, he who by right of relationship came next to be the husband, should unloose his shoe. Now in what character did Christ appear in the world, but as Spouse of the Holy Church? (John 3:29.) John then very properly pronounced himself unworthy to unloose this shoe’s latchet: as if he said, I cannot uncover the feet of the Redeemer, for I claim not the title of spouse, which I have no right to. Or the passage may be explained in another way. We know that shoes are made out of dead animals. Our Lord then, when He came in the flesh, put on, as it were, shoes; because in His Divinity He took the flesh of our corruption, wherein we had of ourselves perished. And the latchet of the shoe, is the seal upon the mystery. John is not able to unloose the shoe’s latchet; i. e. even he cannot penetrate into the mystery of the Incarnation. So he seems to say: What wonder that He is preferred before me, Whom, being born after me, I contemplate, yet the mystery of Whose birth I comprehend not."

Origen: "The place has been understood not amiss thus by a certain person; I am not of such importance, as that for my sake He should descend from this high abode, and take flesh upon Him, as it were a shoe."

References

External links
Other translations of John 1:27 at BibleHub

01:27